City Loop is a 2000 Australian film shot in Brisbane. Locations include Southbank, West End, and Boondall.

It was produced by Bruce Redman for the Queensland-based production company Red Movies

It was originally known as Bored Olives.

Plot
The plot follows the lives of several characters over a few hours on the same night, centering on a pizza delivery place called Speedy's. The stories are:
A chef named Dom has a breakdown.
Misha, a delivery driver, bets he can have sex with his last pizza delivery customer, Sophie.
Erin, another delivery driver, is in love with her best friend, Robert.
The boss, Katie, is having an affair with a co-worker.
An occasional employee called Megan has a wild night.

Cast
Sullivan Stapleton as Dom
Ryan Johnson as Misha
Jessica Napier as Sophie
Brendan Cowell as Robert
Kellie Jones as Erin
Hayley McElhinney as Katie
Megan Dorman as Stacey
John Batchelor as Mr Maxwell
Jason Gann as Boy Hoon

Production
The film was one of five movies produced by the AFC in association with SBS Independent as part of its "Million Dollar Movie Accord" initiative. The others were Fresh Air (film), A Wreck A Tangle, Mallboy and La Spagnola.

The film was shot on super 16mm, and then blown up to 35mm, although it was never theatrically released.

Release
The film premiered at the Asian Film Festival in Tokyo and was selected for screening at the Toronto International Film Festival.

David Stratton in Variety called the film "a visually strong and well-handled pic about a bunch of unattractive and mostly uninteresting young people. Low-budgeter shows strong directorial talent largely wasted on thin material that's unnecessarily full of tricks."

References

External links
 
 City Loop at Ozmovies

2000 films
Australian comedy-drama films
2000s English-language films
2000 comedy-drama films
2000s Australian films